This is a list of autism-related films:

Fiction

Non-fiction

References
Most Popular "Autism" Titles (Sorted by Release Date, descending): 507 at IMDb. Retrieved 12 January 2019.

 
Film